After a second vote of no confidence passed in the Parliament of Romania on 27 April 2012, this time aimed against the Ungureanu Cabinet, Victor Ponta was asked by President Traian Băsescu to form a new Government. His cabinet, unveiled on 1 May, received the parliamentary vote of confidence on 7 May 2012 and governed Romania until the 2012 Romanian legislative election.

Structure 

Ponta I
2012 establishments in Romania
2012 disestablishments in Romania
Cabinets established in 2012
Cabinets disestablished in 2012